The Guatemala national basketball team represents Guatemala in international competitions. It is administrated by the Guatemala National Basketball Federation (Spanish: Federación Nacional de Baloncesto de Guatemala) (FNBG).

Guatemala is the most populous nation in the Americas that has never qualified for a major international basketball event.

Competitions

Performance at Summer Olympics
yet to qualify

Performance at FIBA World Cup
yet to qualify

Performance at FIBA AmeriCup
yet to qualify

Current roster

At the 2015 COCABA Championship:

|}

| valign="top" |

Head coach

Legend

Club – describes lastclub before the tournament
Age – describes ageon 16 September 2015

|}

See also
Jaguares de Petén

References

External links
Guatemala National Basketball Federation – Official website 
Archived records of Guatemala team participations
Latinbasket – Guatemala Men National Team
Basketball Guatemala – Presentation on Facebook

Men's national basketball teams
Basketball
Basketball in Guatemala
1949 establishments in Guatemala